The 1933 Estonian Football Championship was the 13th official football league season in Estonia. Six teams took part in the league five from Tallinn and one from Narva. Each team played every opponent twice, one at home and once on the road, for total of 10 games. VS Sport Tallinn won their third consecutive title.

League table

Results

Top scorers

References

Estonian Football Championship
1
Estonia
Estonia